Two Minutes to Go is a 1921 American silent sport comedy-drama film directed by Charles Ray and written by Richard Andres. The film stars Charles Ray, Mary Anderson, Lionel Belmore, Lincoln Stedman, Truman Van Dyke, and Gus Leonard. The film was released by Associated First National on October 17, 1921.

Cast
Charles Ray as Chester Burnett
Mary Anderson as Ruth Turner
Lionel Belmore as Her Father
Lincoln Stedman as 'Fatty'
Truman Van Dyke as 'Angel'
Gus Leonard as Butler
Tom Wilson as Football Coach
Bert Woodruff as Janitor
François Dumas as Dean of Baker University
Phil Dunham as Professor of Spanish (as Phillip Dunham)

Preservation
Two Minutes to Go is now considered lost.

References

External links

1920s sports comedy-drama films
American sports comedy-drama films
1921 films
American silent feature films
American black-and-white films
First National Pictures films
Lost American films
American football films
1921 lost films
Lost comedy-drama films
Films directed by Charles Ray
1920s American films
Silent American comedy-drama films
1920s English-language films